The Dodge Caliber is a compact hatchback manufactured and marketed by Chrysler's Dodge division from model years 2007 to 2012, replacing the Dodge Neon and Chrysler PT Cruiser.

Following the Caliber concept which debuted at the 2005 Geneva Motor Show, the pre-production version debuted at the 2006 North American International Auto Show, with market launch in March 2006.

The Caliber was manufactured at the Belvidere Assembly (Illinois) plant, and across its six-year model run, just over 400,000 were produced.

Marketing
The Caliber was one of Dodge's first modern offerings in Europe and in Asian markets such as Japan, South Korea, and Singapore, as it established new distribution channels there. It was also introduced in China in 2008 as Dodge's second modern vehicle offering in that market. Dodge vehicles were previously officially sold in China during the World War II era. The introduction of the Caliber marked the return of the Dodge brand to Australia since the early 1970s.

The Caliber in Japan joined the Chrysler PT Cruiser in 2007, as the PT Cruiser was offered since 2000, but as with previous Chrysler products sold in Japan, the width dimension exceeded the Japanese Government dimension regulations, and Japanese consumers were liable for annual taxes for driving a larger car which affected sales. As Chrysler products were considered large to the Japanese market, Chrysler offered products that offered spacious interiors with four doors and one-piece liftgates to broaden their appeal to the Japanese as a compromise for paying the annual tax for large vehicles.

The marketing plan for the first year of the Caliber's production included 20% of the budget for online marketing, print ads, and TV commercials.

Features
The Dodge Caliber offered a continuously variable transmission (called CVT2 by Dodge) sourced from Jatco (a Nissan subsidiary), the second DaimlerChrysler model to employ this technology after the Mercedes-Benz A-Class. It uses a four-cylinder 1.8-2.4 L World gasoline engine, designed jointly by Chrysler, Mitsubishi, and Hyundai.

The Caliber uses a heavily modified GS platform, co-designed with Mitsubishi Motors. The modified GS platform is now called the JS platform by Chrysler for mid-size cars and PM/MK for compact cars. It shares a portion of the platform with the Mitsubishi Lancer, but is most similar to the Jeep Compass and Jeep Patriot. The Caliber wheels have a 5-hole pattern with a 114.3 mm bolt circle.

Safety
The Insurance Institute for Highway Safety (IIHS) gave the Caliber an overall Good score in frontal crash testing. The Dodge Caliber was standard with side curtain airbags, but torso side airbags were optional. The IIHS had scored the Caliber Marginal overall in their side impact test. However, that Caliber was not equipped with the optional torso side airbag.

Models
Three models were available at the Caliber's launch, with a fourth available in mid-2006.

The base SE model features front-wheel drive and a 1.8 L  World I4 attached to a Magna Drivetrain T355 5-speed manual transmission. A 2.0 L  version of the engine paired with the CVT2 transmission was available as an option.

The standard configuration for the SE lacks air conditioning, power windows, door locks, or mirrors. The grille surround is body-colored, while that of all other models is chromed. Canadian SXT and R/T models feature body-color grilles instead of chrome grilles. The Caliber SE doesn't have a tachometer or assist handles,  steel wheels with wheel covers are standard. Some options were not available on the SE.

For 2011, this model was named Express, reverting to SE for 2012. For 2012, the CVT transmission option was dropped only for the SE, leaving the five-speed manual transmission as the only available transmission option for the SE. The CVT continued to be offered in the SXT and SXT Plus models for 2012.

The SXT has the same engine choices as the SE but many more features are available as standard. Air conditioning is standard equipment at this level, including the Chill Zone beverage cooler inside the front lower glove compartment. The gauge cluster gains a tachometer and an (optional) trip computer. The driver's seat adds height adjustment, the passenger seat folds flat for load-carrying, and the rear seats recline. Power windows, locks, mirrors, and remote keyless entry are included. The grille is chromed and  steel wheels are standard, with  aluminum wheels as an option. The cargo area light includes a removable and rechargeable flashlight while the front dome light incorporates two reading lamps. In Europe, this version was also commercialized equipped with a VW-built 2.0 L turbodiesel engine.

Some Dodge publications mention a SXT Sport Wagon model, while others (e.g. the Dodge website) list a SXT "E" package with identical features. This consists of  aluminum wheels, color-keyed cloth seat inserts, color-matched instrument panel trim, along with fog lamps.

The UK SXT Sport model has  alloy wheels, color-keyed cloth seats and instrument panel, and a 9-speaker audio system as standard; early UK models did not have the chrome grille. The UK SXT Sport was available with a Volkswagen 2.0 L diesel engine mated to a six-speed manual transmission.

For 2011, the Heat, Uptown, and Mainstreet were three available trim levels of the Caliber, reverting to SXT and SXT Plus in 2012.

The R/T model has a 2.4 L  version of the World engine, equipped with the CVT2 transmission, and programmed with an 'AutoStick' feature giving six simulated fixed ratios in a clutchless manual mode in addition to the standard CVT 'Drive' mode. All-wheel-drive was an option on the R/T model until 2009, but with automatic transmission only. Eighteen-inch aluminum wheels were standard, while chromed versions were optional. At launch, the CVT2 with all-wheel drive was the only powertrain combination available for the R/T. A front-wheel drive variant with the T355 5-speed manual transmission commenced production in late summer 2006. ABS was standard, and the suspension and steering systems were tuned for performance.

Externally, the R/T is distinguishable by body-color/chrome door handles (replacing black on other models), a chrome side molding, chromed exhaust tip, and front fog lights as standard, as well as R/T badging.

Internally, the car came standard with color-keyed fabric seat inserts, while leather seats were an option as on the SXT. Color-keyed instrument panel trim was also standard, as well as a leather-wrapped steering wheel with audio controls and speed control, and a cargo area cover (all options on the SXT).

The R/T model was discontinued in 2010.

The SRT4 model that was introduced at the Chicago Auto Show in February 2006, was a replacement for the original Neon-based SRT-4 produced by Chrysler's Street and Racing Technology group.

The SRT4 hatchback competed with the Volkswagen GTI and the Mazdaspeed3. It featured a 2.4 L DOHC 16V turbocharged I4 with dual variable valve timing (DVVT). Edmunds called the manufacturer's rating conservative; putting more power on the road than cars costing twice as much. This engine is mated to a Getrag six-speed manual transmission and uses a front-wheel drive drivetrain. The Caliber SRT4 uses a MacPherson strut front suspension and a multilink rear suspension. The SRT4 came with large  vented front disc brakes (from the Dodge Charger Police Pack version) with dual-piston calipers and  rear single-piston disc brakes. It also featured four-wheel ABS, with electronic assistance. Package options included polished aluminum wheels, Goodyear Eagle F1 Supercar tires, SIRIUS satellite radio with Kicker SRT livin' loud audio, EVIC with performance pages, security alarm, and optional paint colors.

The SRT4 model of the Caliber was available through 2009.

Engines

Updates

2009
For the 2009 model, the Caliber underwent a minor revamp. The plain plastic black-colored door handles available on base models were replaced by painted car-colored handles previously available only on R/T. In addition, the trunk lid was reduced in weight and simplified in its opening. In the interior, all panels were made black instead of grey. The "DODGE" badge that was on top of the Ram logo at the middle was shifted to the left, while the "CALIBER" badge was moved to the right from the left, both equal in font size. The car model title, previously indicated on the right, was moved to the bottom right corner of the gate lid.

2010
The 2010 model year was unveiled at the 2009 Frankfurt Motor Show, featuring a refreshed interior design composed of metallic outlines and parts of glass to suppress the abundance of plastic materials on previous models, as well as the addition of an 8-way power driver's seat, heated mirrors, and an automatic climate control system previously available only on R/T. The dashboard also features the relocation of the glove box due to many customer complaints, which now occupies the spot over the radio panel and comprises a "push-open" lock instead of the previous "squeeze-and-lift" opening mechanism.

The 1.8 L engine was dropped from the SE and SXT models, and the SRT-4 model is discontinued.

For the United States market, the models were promptly renamed and rebranded, with SE becoming "Main Street", SXT — "Heat" and R/T — "Rush". Two more models were launched in 2010: a luxury all-included variant "Uptown" and a base variant "Express" in which the black plastic handles returned. "Express" was the only model not to feature automatic climate control as an option, the "Main Street" featured speed control, an anti-lock brake system, and electronic stability control, which were previously unavailable as options for SE. All models except "Express" featured 17-inch wheels.

2011
The 2011 model brought six new paint schemes, standard stability control except on Express models, Sirius traffic when equipped with a navigation system, 18-inch chrome-clad wheels available on Uptown models (17" painted are standard), updated steering except on Express models, and new shocks and a thicker rear anti-roll bar on Rush and Heat models. The Caliber and the Nitro were the only two cars in the Dodge vehicle lineup to still feature the Ram logo on both fascia, rear, and the steering wheel. The Dodge Nitro also featured driver and passenger floor mats. The logo was removed from the mats in Calibers with the 2009 model.

2012
For the 2012 model year, the models were renamed back to SE, SXT, and SXT Plus. The Plus version includes all the SXT items and 18-inch aluminum wheels with performance tires, as well as a 6-way power-adjustable driver seat. The SXT Plus was not sold in Canada.

Discontinuation
The 2010 Caliber was the last model sold in Europe. The 2011 model ended production on 23 November 2011, in United States, with the remainder being sold as the 2012 model year Caliber in both U.S. and Canada. A successor called the Dart, based on the Alfa Romeo Giulietta's platform, went on sale in June 2012 for the 2013 model-year as the compact vehicle in Dodge's lineup.

Sales

Notes

References

External links

 Dodge Caliber official website (archived)
 

Caliber
Compact cars
Euro NCAP small family cars
Hatchbacks
Vehicles with CVT transmission
All-wheel-drive vehicles
Front-wheel-drive vehicles

2010s cars
Cars introduced in 2006